Michelle Ehlen is an American film director, producer, screenwriter, and actress best known for her comedic feature Butch Jamie.

Career
Michelle is a graduate of The Los Angeles Film School where she studied writing and directing. She wrote, directed, and acted in the short film Half Laughing which broadcast on Logo and is on The Ultimate Lesbian Short Film Festival DVD. Butch Jamie is Ehlen's first feature film. Openly lesbian herself, she wrote, directed, and starred in the movie as a butch lesbian actress who gets cast as a man in a film. She won the 2007 Outfest Grand Jury Award for "Outstanding Actress in a Feature Film" for her performance.

Filmography
 Maybe Someday (2022) as Jay (also writer/director/producer)
 S&M Sally (2015) as Jamie (also writer/director/producer) 
 Heterosexual Jill (2013) as Jamie (also writer/director/producer)
 Butch Jamie (2007) as Jamie (also writer/director/producer)
 Half Laughing (2003) as Evie (also writer/director/producer)
 The Breast of Times (2003) (director)
 Ballet Diesel (2002) as Ballet Diesel (also writer/director/producer)

See also 
 List of female film and television directors
 List of lesbian filmmakers
 List of LGBT-related films directed by women

References

External links
 
 Production Company Site
 Butch Jamie Official Site

1978 births
Living people
American people of German descent
American film actresses
American film directors
American women film directors
American women screenwriters
American lesbian actresses
American LGBT screenwriters
American lesbian artists
LGBT film directors
Lesbian screenwriters
American lesbian writers
21st-century American women writers